The Russian national under-20 football team, formerly known as the Soviet national youth football team was the under-20 (for FIFA U-20 World Cup) and under-19 (for UEFA Under-19 Championship) football teams of the Soviet Union. It ceased to exist on the breakup of the Union, and was succeeded by the Russian national under-20 football team.

Following the realignment of FIFA's youth competitions in 1977, the Soviet Union national under-20 football team was formed and competed until 1993 (in 1992 it qualified as CIS youth under-18 football team) qualifying 7 times. Following dissolution of the Soviet Union, the Soviet qualification was passed to Russia which competed in the 1993 FIFA World Youth Championship. Two years later Russia managed to qualify for the tournament on its own effort, but since then it yet to qualify for it.

On 28 February 2022, due to the 2022 Russian invasion of Ukraine and in accordance with a recommendation by the International Olympic Committee (IOC), FIFA and UEFA suspended the participation of Russia, including in the Qatar 2022 World Cup. The Russian Football Union unsuccessfully appealed the FIFA and UEFA bans to the Court of Arbitration for Sport, which upheld the bans.

FIFA U-20 World Cup record 

 Champions   Runners-up   Third place   Fourth place

*Denotes draws include knockout matches decided on penalty kicks.

Current squad

The following players were called up for friendly games against Croatia U-20 on 5 September 2018 and 7 September 2018.

Head coach: Mikhail Galaktionov.

|-----
! colspan="9" bgcolor="#B0D3FB" align="left" |
|----- bgcolor="#DFEDFD"

|-----
! colspan="9" bgcolor="#B0D3FB" align="left" |
|----- bgcolor="#DFEDFD"

|-----
! colspan="9" bgcolor="#B0D3FB" align="left" |
|----- bgcolor="#DFEDFD"

Honours

FIFA U-20 World Cup

Individual
 Golden Ball: Vladimir Bessonov (1977)
 Golden Shoe: Oleg Salenko (1989), Sergei Sherbakov (1991)

Team
 FIFA Fair Play Award: 1991

Valeriy Lobanovskyi Memorial Tournament
 Winners: 2010

See also 
 FIFA U-20 World Cup
 UEFA European Under-19 Championship
 Russia women's national under-20 football team

References

External links
 FIFA Under-20 website Contains full results archive
 The Rec.Sport.Soccer Statistics Foundation Contains full record of U-20 Championships.

European national under-20 association football teams
under-20